The 2021 BCL Americas Playoffs were the 2nd playoffs of the Basketball Champions League Americas (BCL Americas) and were the concluding tournament of the 2021 BCL Americas season. The playoffs began on 10 April 2021 and ended on 14 April 2021 with the final. All games were single-elimination and were played at the Alexis Arguello Sports Complex in Managua, Nicaragua.

Bracket

Quarterfinals

Semifinals

Third place game

Final

References

2021 Playoffs